Luis Oscar Jiménez Herrera (born 1983) is a Mexican serial killer active between 2013 and 2016, mainly in the state of Nuevo León, who killed 16 women in this period of time. In 2018, he was sentenced to 123 years imprisonment. He was dubbed The Tinaco Killer.

Background 
Luis Oscar Jiménez was born in Durango City, within a dysfunctional family in which his father mistreated his mother. Growing up, he developed a deep contempt for women. According to unofficial sources, he has been the victim of sexual abuse in his childhood. Jiménez also served in the Mexican Army, and by the time of his arrest he already had a criminal record for minor crimes in Tamaulipas.

Crimes

Murder of María Atino García 
On October 30, 2010, in Ciudad Valles, San Luis Potosí, the body of 29-year-old María Atino García Martínez, from Aquismón, was found inside an empty tinaco on the roof of a furniture store, apparently strangled to the point where her cervical vertebrae had been broken. At that time, Luis Oscar was arrested and proposed as a suspect in her murder. He was on vacation with a woman named Gloria Martínez, who allegedly was his wife, and they were staying at the Hotel San Cosmé. Gloria claimed that on the night of October 29, Jiménez had met María Atino and arranged to have sex in exchange for money; he later confessed to sleeping with, but not killing her. According to the statements of the hotel receptionist, the victim had left the hotel that night. Luis Oscar ended up being released.

Serial murders 
The rest of the murders attributed to Jiménez began in 2013, in Nuevo León. His modus operandi consisted of gaining the victim's trust, after which he would take them to hotels where they would have sex. When they wanted to leave, Luis Oscar would become enraged and assaulted them, first hitting the women to incapacitate and subsequently strangle them.

His last known victim was a 46-year-old woman named Rosa Griselda Alvarado Flores, a resident of Apodaca. Alvarado's body was found handcuffed in downtown Monterrey, on May 6, 2016, with bruises on the face. According to Jiménez's statements, she had charged him with 200 pesos for sex and were together for about an hour. When she decided that she wanted to leave, they began arguing and he began beating Alvarado until she was unconscious, strangling her to death afterwards. Once dead, he tied her hands and feet.

See also
List of serial killers by country

References 

1983 births
2010 murders in Mexico
2013 murders in Mexico
2016 murders in Mexico
20th-century Mexican criminals
Living people
Male serial killers
Mexican serial killers
People convicted of murder by Mexico
People from Durango City
Prisoners and detainees of Mexico
Violence against women in Mexico